Auratonota badiaurea is a species of moth of the family Tortricidae. It is found in Brazil.

The wingspan is 18–23 mm. The ground colour of the forewings is whitish cream, suffused ochreous or ferruginous brown, with paler and darker groups of scales. The hindwings are brown.

References

Moths described in 2000
Auratonota
Moths of South America